Azanak-e Olya (also Romanized as Āzanaḵ-e ‘Olyā) is a village in Seyyedvaliyeddin Rural District, Sardasht District, Dezful County, Khuzestan Province, Iran. According to a 2006 census, eight families lived there, consisting of 41 people.

References 

Populated places in Dezful County